Beat Onto Jazz Festival is a jazz festival held annually in Bitonto, Italy since 2001. It is held on the main piazza of the town next to the cathedral. The Alberto Parmegiani Quartet performed in 2016.

References

External links
Official site

Jazz festivals in Italy
Bitonto
Music festivals established in 2001
2001 establishments in Italy
Culture of Apulia